The Human Dimension is a framework for United States Army  to Optimize Human Performance as part of Force 2025 and Beyond. The Human Dimension White Paper expands on the topic covered in this page.

It is not enough for leaders to tolerate or even grow comfortable with uncertainty, the Army requires agile, adaptive, and ethical leaders trained and educated to improve and thrive in uncertainty.

Definition 
The cognitive, physical, and social components of Soldier, Army Civilian, leader, and organizational development and performance essential to raise, prepare, and employ the Army in unified land operations.

Purpose 
Establish a framework for the Army to assess, integrate, and synchronize its training and education, science and technology, holistic health and fitness, medical and personnel policies, programs, and initiatives in support of the Army Profession. Establishes an initial foundation for achieving human performance optimization as part of the Army's efforts to develop Force 2025 and Beyond (F2025B). Provide an initial framework in the form of ends, ways, and means to frame development of the elements necessary to improve the performance of Army personnel – the strength of our Army.

Only through our ability to optimize human performance, building resilient Soldiers, adaptive leaders, and cohesive teams, will we maintain the ability to prevent conflict, shape the international environment, and win decisively.

Problem 
The strategic security environment is undergoing rapid evolution where a complex and dynamic mix of cultures, a broad range of actors, and unprecedented proliferation of technology with military application create a competitive environment that challenges US interests. These geopolitical changes are rapid, generate ambiguity and lead to regional instability and conflict often tied to ancient grievances. It is increasingly difficult to anticipate multiple emerging threats to US security interests and adjust the Army's doctrinal, organizational, and material resources to cope with them.  Therefore, we must design the Army to face threats that can rapidly adapt to exploit our weaknesses faster than what we have experienced in the past.

Adjusting to this reality demands a different approach. To continue to dominate on the battlefield of the future, the Army must invest in its people as the most agile and adaptive resource. Preserving a technological edge will remain important but technology alone is insufficient to retain overmatch in the face of highly adaptive adversaries. The Army must seek to maintain and exploit a decisive cognitive edge over potential adversaries. Realizing that technology remains an essential enabler with tremendous potential in the long-term, today few technological solutions exist. To overcome this shortfall, only the optimized Soldier provides the promise of meeting the cognitive demands of a modern and complex battlefield. With a shrinking force structure and growing demands on the individual Soldier, it is essential for the Army to design institutions and programs that develop the very best talent and abilities in every member of the Total Army team. This holistic body of effort is defined as human performance optimization.

Environment 

In Operational Environments to 2028: The Strategic Environment for Unified Land Operations (August 2012) the United States Army Training and Doctrine Command (TRADOC) G2 (Intelligence) describes the strategic environment as “ambiguous, presenting multiple layers of complexity and a multiplicity of actors challenging the Army with requirements beyond traditional warfighting skills.”  From this complex picture of the future, four emerging trends illustrate the cognitive, physical, and social demands placed upon Soldiers of the future.

Megacities: The world population of 2025 is increasingly urban, coastal, mobile, and interconnected. The United Nations estimates that within the next forty years the urban population will grow by another 2.5 billion people. Many of these urban populations will inhabit vast, densely packed megacities, with populations in excess of ten million people, in countries already struggling to provide governance and essential services for their current populations. Vast urban slums operating outside of the control of legitimate government will lead to increases in violence and lawlessness. These slums will become sanctuaries for adversaries who seek to remain indistinguishable from the population and negate the technological overmatch of even the most sophisticated precision guided missiles. In this environment, where sustainable political outcomes may mandate the use of land power, military objectives cannot be achieved from standoff range. The Army must therefore, develop leaders who thrive in the ambiguous and chaotic conditions present in these sprawling megacities.

Ubiquitous Global Surveillance: By 2030, the increased availability of commercially manufactured drones, portable cameras, and wireless bandwidth will make it possible to track nearly all activity in public spaces in near real time. The private use of drones, closed circuit television, and satellites will allow social media users, bloggers, and traditional media outlets to secure live feeds of any event on the globe within minutes and proliferate them immediately. The social impact of live broadcasting of tactical battlefield actions is likely to place extraordinary pressures on small unit leaders. In the future, leaders frequently will need to make highly stressful tactical decisions before a live global audience. In the past, leaders were expected to do the right thing when nobody was watching. By contrast, tomorrow's small unit leaders will be expected to do the right thing with the whole world watching. This increased scrutiny requires leaders steeped in cultural awareness, ethical decision-making, and professional judgment.

Rapid Technological Innovation: Advances in technology such as additive manufacturing (3D printing) will allow technologically savvy adversaries to acquire inexpensive high-end weapons systems rapidly. The proliferation of these technologies will increase the probability that future forces will face sophisticated improvised weapons quickly engineered to mitigate US technological overmatch. Future non-state adversaries, unfettered by bureaucracy, will be able to exploit private sector innovation to adapt faster than more established security institutions. They will rapidly translate commercial innovations into military capability to gain asymmetric advantages in niche areas, with an increased potential to threaten US security interests. This will dramatically accelerate the speed of competitive innovation required to maintain the technological advantage over adversaries on the battlefield. Army institutions must enter future conflicts with the ability to respond to an enemy's tactics and technology at a much faster rate than in the past. Likewise, leaders must anticipate adversarial action and plan for adaptation to US overmatch.

Conflict Short of Warfare: As US precision targeting capability improves, adaptive adversaries will seek to avoid direct, unambiguous action that will provoke a violent US response. Instead, they will seek to remain in the grey shadowland between peace and war, avoiding US strengths, while attacking US weaknesses in subtle ways. Understanding this, future adversaries will “fight stupid or fight asymmetrically” and the Army should prepare for the latter. Subtle nuances of both international and US law will affect leader's decision-making processes as the traditional definition of an enemy combatant becomes increasingly obsolete. As adversaries avoid becoming easily identifiable targets, Soldiers will increasingly have to decide not just how but if the employment of violence will best serve national interests.

Operational Approach 
The Soldier as part of a trusted team is the decisive edge; human performance optimization goes beyond just a focus on the individual Soldier. Soldiers fight as part of cohesive teams and are empowered by effective institutions that train, deploy, and equip them. Successful human performance optimization must involve simultaneous and integrated efforts focused at the individual, team, and institutional level. This framework organizes the activities of human performance optimization along three broad lines of effort: Establish Cognitive Dominance, Execute Realistic Training, and Drive Institutional Agility. These three lines of effort describe in broad terms the WAYS that will achieve the END of optimized human performance. This operational approach nests with the Army Warfighting Challenges and supports the Army Operating Concept.

Optimize Human Performance

Endstate:
Army leaders are trusted professionals of character who demonstrate comprehensive improvement of knowledge, skills, and attributes in education, training, and experience to optimize and sustain an individual's ability to succeed at any assigned mission as part of a trusted team.

Establish Cognitive Dominance 
A position of intellectual advantage over a situation or adversary that fosters proactive agility over reactive adaptation, facilitating the ability to anticipate change before it occurs. The Cognitive Dominance line of effort describes all of the activities related to the creation of resilient Soldiers and adaptive leaders who are comfortable adapting to novel experiences and can thrive in uncertain and chaotic environments. While warfare has always been cognitively demanding, in the modern operational environment even the basics of warfare have changed. Today, the growing complexity of mastering the basics coupled with the increasing requirements to interact in front of a global audience place greater demands on the individual Soldier than ever before.

Execute Realistic Training 
Soldiers do not fight as individuals; they fight as part of cohesive teams that operate on the basis of mutual trust. The most effective way to foster trust is through tough, rigorous training that not only fully replicates the physical stresses of combat, but the social and cultural aspects as well. The Realistic Training line of effort encompasses all the activities related to the creation of cohesive teams of Army professionals who have the basic foundation of trust upon which to build a culture that practices mission command, adapting to ambiguous situations through the decentralized execution of commander's intent. In order to ensure we retain tough, realistic training readiness we must accept that the training paradigm and the basics of soldiering have evolved. We must adopt a new training paradigm that emphasizes a mastery of the basics and incorporates complexity and the human dimension into training.

Drive Institutional Agility 
The ability of the larger Army institution to anticipate changing conditions in stride, lead through innovation, and demonstrate crucial capabilities in advance of need. Improving the capacity of Army professionals to thrive in conditions of uncertainty will require a fundamental reshaping of the approach in which our institutions man, train, educate, and equip the Soldier and team. This broad-reaching approach focuses on ways in which the institutional Army will address its focus in the future to include rapid curricular responsiveness at the training and education institutions, precision talent management from recruitment to retirement, and innovative approaches to developing and disseminating doctrine.

Previous Informing Work 

Army Operating Concept (TRADOC Pam 525-3-1): Published in October 2014 describes how the Army will operate in an uncertain and complex future environment by maneuvering from multiple directions, presenting adversaries with multiple dilemmas, avoiding his strengths, and striking his weaknesses.  This concept recognizes the importance of highly adaptive teams of professionals who improve and thrive in uncertainty and chaos. To produce these teams the AOC establishes the requirement to “develop innovative leaders and optimize human performance” as one of the ten fundamental principles of how the Army must operate in the future.

Human Dimension Concept (TRADOC Pam 525-3-7): Published in May 2014, describes the broad human dimension capabilities the Army requires to meet the challenges of the future operational environment, and serves as a common framework for adapting and enhancing the Army's effort to achieve superior warfighting effectiveness.

Civilian Workforce Transformation Initiative (CWT): The Army civilian corps makes up about 23 percent of the total Army force with more than 300,000 professionals, serving globally, in roughly 500 unique job series. Through CWT, the Army intends to produce a purpose-driven, professional, and fully competent civilian workforce. Competence, education and experience are the foundation of the way Army civilian's will be developed, measured, and managed in the future. The mandates for CWT include hiring the right people, managing the entire workforce within career programs, meeting civilian workforce training and development goals, and providing a pathway for professionally developed civilians to meet the Army's needs of today and tomorrow.

Force 2025 and Beyond (F2025B) Integration and Synchronization Plan: Establishes a vision for the Army of Force 2025. It defines a key task of that vision is to "develop training, education, leader development, and talent management systems and processes that will optimize the potential of every Soldier and Civilian in the Total Army."

Operational Environments to 2028: The Strategic Environment for Unified Land Operations: Describes the key conditions and adversary strategies manifesting across the strategic environment through 2028. This includes an analysis of the human implications of these conditions on future warfighters.

Army Warfighting Challenge (AWFC): Framework The Army Capabilities Integration Center (ARCIC) will use the AWFC framework as the organizing construct to lead future force development and integration efforts. AWFCs are enduring first order challenges described in the AOC, the solutions to which may improve the combat effectiveness of the current and future force.  This structure integrates near, mid and far-term modernization efforts for the Army. Properly implemented, the AWFC sustains collaboration across the community of practice by providing a foundation for Army concept and capability development.

References

External links 
 U.S. Army
 U.S. Army Training and Doctrine Command
 U.S. Army Training and Doctrine Command Wikipedia Page
 U.S. Army Combined Arms Center

United States Army Training and Doctrine Command